Willem, Baron Ripperda, Lord of Hengelo, Boekelo, Boxbergen, Rijsenburg and Solmsburg (Twente, 1600 – Hengelo, 1669), was an ambassador at the peace conferences of Osnabrück and Münster which ended both the Thirty Years' War in Germany and the Eighty Years' War between Spain and the Netherlands.

Willem was the son of Baron Unico Ripperda van Boxbergen, drost of Twente, and Anna van Doetinchem. The old, noble House of Ripperda originally came from Groningen. In 1627 he married Aleyd van den Bouchorst tot Wimmenum.

Willem Ripperda left his military career in 1623. In 1631 he was elected to represent the Province of Overijssel at the States-General of the Netherlands in The Hague. He was a loyal supporter of the Prince of Orange and was sent to the peace negotiations in Osnabrück and Münster in 1644. These resulted in the signing of the Peace of Westphalia.

Sources
 Genealogie van het Geslacht Ripperda von mr. C.P.L. Rutgers (1902)
 Genealogie van het Geslacht Ripperda von P.W.G. van Agteren (2014))
 Genealogie über 16 Generationen des Reichsfreiherrlichen Geschlechtes von Ripperda von Udo Reichsfreiherr v. Ripperda (Koningsbergen, 1934)
 Dutch Culture in a European Perspective, Willem Frijhoff, Marijke Spies, Published by Uitgeverij Van Gorcum, 2004,

External links
http://www.muenster.de/friede/d/04_akteure/k31.htm
http://angel.regioportals.nl/tctubantia/Goor/Familie.html
Ripperda, Willem in Vol 6 of the "Nieuw Nederlandsch biografisch woordenboek". (in Dutch)

1600 births
1669 deaths
People from Twente
Dutch nobility